The 2008–09 season is the 31st season in the fourth division of English football, and the 94th season as a professional club played by Northampton Town F.C., a football club based in Northampton, Northamptonshire, England.

Players

Competitions

League One

League table

Results summary

League position by match

Matches

FA Cup

Carling Cup

Johnstone's Paint Trophy

Appearances, goals and cards

Northampton Town F.C. seasons
Northampton Town